Michael Darcy (6 September 1901 – 4 November 1964) was an Irish hurler who played as a right corner-back for the Tipperary senior team.

Darcy made his first appearance for the team during the 1925 championship and was a regular member of the starting fifteen until his retirement after the 1927 championship. During that time he won a set of All-Ireland and Munster medals.

At club level Darcy played with Nenagh Éire Óg.

His brother Jack was also an All-Ireland winner with Tipperary.

References

1901 births
1964 deaths
Nenagh Éire Óg hurlers
Tipperary inter-county hurlers
All-Ireland Senior Hurling Championship winners